The 1909 Massachusetts gubernatorial election was held on November 2, 1909. Incumbent Governor Republican Eben S. Draper was re-elected, defeating Democratic nominee James H. Vahey with 48.64% of the vote.

Democratic nomination

Candidates
James H. Vahey, former State Senator and candidate for Governor in 1908
John T. Coughlin, Mayor of Fall River

Results
At the Democratic state convention, held on September 30 at Faneuil Hall, Vahey defeated Coughlin by 384 votes to 198.

Republican nomination

Candidates
Eben S. Draper, incumbent Governor

Results
At the Republican state convention, held on October 2, Draper was re-nominated by acclamation.

General election

Results

Governor

Lieutenant Governor

See also
 1909 Massachusetts legislature

References

Bibliography

Governor
1909
Massachusetts
November 1909 events